Kent-Meridian High School is a high school located in Kent, Washington, United States, and part of the Kent School District. Kent-Meridian is one of four high schools in the Kent School District. It serves students in grades nine through twelve who live mainly in the south region of the district. Its principal is David Radford.

History
The school opened in its present form in 1951 when the Kent School District merged with the Panther Lake and Meridian School Districts.  This new high school served all three districts.  The former Kent High School building became Kent Junior High School.

Athletics
Kent-Meridian is part of the Cascade Division of the North Puget Sound League as of the 2016-17 school year.
Kent-Meridian High School's athletic teams are known as the Royals.  Teams compete at French Field located next to the school.

Kent-Meridian uses a swimming pool which was built as a part of King County Forward Thrust which is now owned by the city of Kent.

Kent-Meridian won a track state championship in 2011, and finished second in 2009.

Taylor Trophy
The Taylor Trophy is given to and kept by the winner of the yearly football rivalry between Auburn High School and Kent-Meridian dating back to 1908.  Dr. Owen Taylor created the trophy presentation in 1929. Dr. Taylor owned the Kent hospital that was on Second Avenue and Gowe Street and he had a home on Scenic Hill.  The rivalry is the second oldest football rivalry in Washington.

Kent-Meridian Technology Academy 
Kent-Meridian is home to the Kent-Meridian Technology Academy. The KMTA is an innovative Small Learning Community that is part of Kent-Meridian, characterized by its utilization of project-based learning, STEAM, and 21st Century Skills.

Notable alumni

Red Badgro, former MLB player (St. Louis Browns)
Karl Best, former MLB player (Seattle Mariners, Minnesota Twins)
John Bronson, NFL football player for the Arizona Cardinals, 2005-2007
Morgan Christen, circuit judge of the United States Court of Appeals for the Ninth Circuit, appointed by Barack Obama
Robin Earl, former Chicago Bears Running Back
Jeff Jaeger, former NFL kicker
Reggie Jones, attended (2001–04), NFL Cornerback (2009–10)
PZ Myers, blogger.
Robert L. Phillips, author, entrepreneur and professor.
Dave Reichert, Congressman from Washington, former King County sheriff
Jaleen Roberts, track and field athlete
John Taylor, reality television star of Too Fat for 15: Fighting Back
Kyle Townsend, Grammy and Academy Award nominated Record Producer

References

External links 
Kent-Meridian High School
Washington State Report Card for Kent-Meridian

High schools in King County, Washington
Education in Kent, Washington
Educational institutions established in 1951
South Puget Sound League
International Baccalaureate schools in Washington (state)
Public high schools in Washington (state)
1951 establishments in Washington (state)